Las hijas del Amapolo ("The Daughters of Amapolo") is a 1962 Mexican film.

Premise
Four brothers arrive in a Mexican village in time for the annual town festival. They are instantly enamored with four sisters.  But they will need to contend with their father (known notoriously as "el Amapolo"), as well as to compete with other men in town for their attention. Their grandmother adds an interesting twist to the festivities.
This movie includes a dozen great musical numbers.

Cast
 Jose Elias Moreno      -----as    Felipe de las Casas-----alone, tall & red
 Sara Garcia            -----as    grandma (abuela)----- la Coronela (la Generala)

Felipe's daughters:
 Lucha Moreno           -----as    Licha de las Casas-----tallest
 Maria Eugenia Rubio    -----as    Rosa de las Casas-----stutters
 Carmela Rey            -----as    Luz de las Casas-----charro outfit
 Angelica Maria         -----as    Colo de las Casas-----recites poetry

Serrano brothers, in the same order as the daughter each wants to marry:
 Jose Juan Hernandez  -----as    Pepe Serrano-----wide band on hat
 Eduardo Silvestre      -----as    David Serrano-----Mr Universo
 Paco Michel            -----as    Luis Serrano-----white shirt black pants
 Rene Cardona Jr.       -----as    Julio Serrano-----dark shirt, thin stripes

Others:
 José Alfredo Jiménez   -----as    bar singer-----sings title song
 Amparo Arozamena       -----as    Lolita-----bar owner (Lola)
 Sergio Llanes          -----as    Tijeras-----main antagonist
 Alberto Marcos         -----as    el cura-----priest
 Arturo Siliceo Castillo -----as   el nino-----boy
 Jorge Casanova         -----as    jailer
 Eduardo Zamarripa      -----as    Registro Civil
 Armando Gordo Acosta   -----as    barbell trickster

External links
 

1962 films
Mexican musical comedy films
1960s Spanish-language films
1960s Mexican films